James Rory Brennan (29 February 1932 — 24 January 2009) was a Northern Irish footballer who played as a left winger.

Career
Brennan began his career in Northern Ireland, playing for Glentoran. In 1952, Brennan signed for Birmingham City, however failed to make an appearance during his time at the club. Two years later, Brennan signed for Swindon Town, making 16 Football League appearances, scoring once, during his time at the club.

In 1956, Brennan signed for Chelmsford City, making 53 appearances as a full-back, before being released in 1959. Following Brennan's release from Chelmsford, he signed for Kidderminster Harriers. In 1960, Brennan emigrated to South Africa, playing in the National Football League for Randfontein.

References

1932 births
2009 deaths
Association football wingers
Association football defenders
Association footballers from Northern Ireland
People from Downpatrick
Glentoran F.C. players
Birmingham City F.C. players
Swindon Town F.C. players
Chelmsford City F.C. players
National Football League (South Africa) players
English Football League players
Expatriate association footballers from Northern Ireland
Expatriate soccer players in South Africa